Charles Merian Cooper (January 16, 1856 – November 14, 1923) was an American attorney and politician who served as a U.S. Representative from Florida from 1893 until 1897.

Early life and education 
Cooper was born on January 16, 1856, in Athens, Georgia. His father, Charles Phillip Cooper, served as a United States Treasury Department agent until the American Civil War, when he was appointed to help organize the Confederate States Treasury Department. In 1864, he and his family moved to Jacksonville, Florida in order to escape Union forces.

Cooper studied law at Gainesville Academy, graduating in 1867. He was accepted into the Florida Bar in the same year, and began a private practice in St. Augustine, Florida.

Political career 
In 1880, Cooper, a Democrat, was elected to the Florida House of Representatives, representing St. John's County. He served until 1884, when he was elected to the Florida Senate from St. John's County. On January 13, 1885, Cooper was appointed as the 15th Florida Attorney General by Governor Edward A. Perry. Cooper served until 1889 when his term expired. Later that year, he was one of three commissioners appointed to revise the state's statutes.

In 1892, the Democratic U.S. Representative from Florida's 2nd district, Robert Bullock, did not seek reelection. Cooper successfully received the Democratic nomination and defeated his opponent, Populist State Representative Austin S. Mann, with 76% of the vote. Cooper successfully sought reelection in 1894, defeating Populist Montholom Atkinson with 80% of the vote. The Republican Party did not nominate any candidates in either of the races.

Cooper did not run for reelection in 1896 and returned to his private practice in Jacksonville.

Personal life 
In 1880, Cooper married Rosa Leonardi. They had two children, Charles Philip and James Jackson Gignilliat.

Death
Cooper died in Jacksonville on November 14, 1923. He is buried in Jacksonville's St. Mary's Cemetery.

Electoral history

References

1856 births
1923 deaths
Democratic Party members of the Florida House of Representatives
Democratic Party Florida state senators
Democratic Party members of the United States House of Representatives from Florida
Florida Attorneys General
Politicians from Athens, Georgia
People from Jacksonville, Florida
19th-century American politicians